Angered is a locality situated in Göteborg Municipality, Västra Götaland County, Sweden. It is 12 km north of Gothenburg and it had 950 inhabitants in 2010. The locality consists of buildings adjacent to Angered Church. Commuting to Gothenburg occurs.

References 

Populated places in Västra Götaland County
Populated places in Gothenburg Municipality